The 1991 St. Petersburg Open was a women's tennis tournament played from September 21 through 29, 1991, on indoor carpet courts at the St. Petersburg Sports and Concert Complex in Saint Petersburg, Soviet Union, that was part of Tier V of the 1991 Kraft General Foods World Tour (1991 WTA Tour). It was the third edition of the WTA tournament inaugurated under the title of Virginia Slims of Moscow in 1989 and later known as the Moscow Ladies Open.

Finals

Singles 

 Larisa Savchenko-Neiland defeated  Barbara Rittner 3–6, 6–3, 6–4
 It was Savchenko-Neiland's 1st of 2 WTA singles titles of her career.

Doubles 

 Elena Brioukhovets /  Natalia Medvedeva defeated  Isabelle Demongeot /  Jo Durie 7–5, 6–3
 It was Brioukhovets's 1st WTA doubles title of the year and the 3rd and last of her career. It was Medvedeva's 1st WTA doubles title of the year and the 5th of her career.

References

External links 
 

St. Petersburg \Open
Moscow Ladies Open
1991 in Russian women's sport
September 1991 sports events in Russia
1991 in Russian tennis